Jeremiah Timothy Givens (born May 24, 1987), also known by the stage name JGivens, is an American former Christian hip hop musician. He has released four studio albums: Run in 2011, El v. Envy in 2013, Fly Exam in 2015, and Domino in 2019.

Early life
Jeremiah Timothy Givens was born on May 24, 1987, in Los Angeles, California, to Brenda Banks. His mother moved to Las Vegas, Nevada when Givens was five years old, to remove the family from the presence of gang life.

Givens obtained his bachelor's degree from the University of Southern California in mechanical engineering at the Viterbi School of Engineering.

Music career
JGivens' music career started in 2008, and his debut studio album, Run, was released on July 22, 2011, independently. His subsequent studio album, El v. Envy, was released on August 6, 2013, independently. His third and most recent studio album, Fly Exam, was released on September 25, 2015, with Humble Beast Records.

In 2016, JGivens was featured on Lecrae's mixtape, Church Clothes 3, performing the song "Misconceptions 3" alongside Lecrae, John Givez and Jackie Hill Perry.

In 2019, Givens transitioned away from Christian hip-hop and revealed he was addicted to drugs, openly gay, and HIV-positive.

Discography
Studio albums
 Run (July 22, 2011, independent)
 El v. Envy (August 6, 2013, independent)
 Fly Exam (September 25, 2015, Humble Beast)
 Domino (October 18, 2019, independent)

References

External links
 Official website
 New Release Today profile
 Wade-O Radio interview 

1987 births
Living people
LGBT African Americans
LGBT Christians
LGBT rappers
Musicians from Los Angeles
Musicians from Las Vegas
American performers of Christian hip hop music
Rappers from Los Angeles
Rappers from Nevada
USC Viterbi School of Engineering alumni
West Coast hip hop musicians
21st-century American rappers
American gay musicians
20th-century LGBT people
21st-century LGBT people
21st-century African-American musicians